The Muntz Stereo-Pak, commonly known as the 4-track cartridge, is a magnetic tape sound recording cartridge technology.

The Stereo-Pak cartridge was inspired by the Fidelipac 3-track tape cartridge system invented by George Eash in 1954 and used by radio broadcasters for commercials and jingles  beginning in 1959. The Stereo-Pak was adapted from the basic Fidelipac cartridge design by Earl "Madman" Muntz in 1962 with Muntz partnering with Eash, as a way to play prerecorded tapes in cars. 

The tape is arranged in an infinite loop which traverses a central hub and crosses a tape head, usually under a pressure pad to assure proper tape contact. The tape is pulled by tension, and spooling is aided by a lubricant, usually graphite.

History
The endless loop tape cartridge was designed in 1952 by Bernard Cousino of Toledo, Ohio. 

Entrepreneur Earl "Madman" Muntz of Los Angeles, California, saw a potential in these broadcast carts for an automobile music tape system, and in 1962 introduced his "Stereo-Pak 4-Track Stereo Tape Cartridge System" and prerecorded tapes, initially in California and Florida. He licensed popular music albums from the major record companies and duplicated them on these 4-track cartridges, or CARtridges, as they were first advertised. Previously, music in the car had been restricted mostly to radios. Records, due to their methods of operation and size, were not practical for use in a car, although several companies tried to market an automobile record player including the Highway Hi-Fi and the Auto-Com flexidisc

References

Audiovisual introductions in 1962
Audio storage
Tape recording
Discontinued media formats
American inventions
1962 in music
1962 in technology
Products introduced in 1962